Starke–Meinershagen–Boeke Rural Historic District is a historic national historic district located near Marthasville, Warren County, Missouri.  The district encompasses seven contributing buildings on an 1860s farmstead.  The contributing buildings are a two-story, brick I-house and brick smokehouse dated between 1863 and 1870; and a gambrel roof barn, two machine sheds, a garage, and a hen house dated to the early-20th century.

It was listed on the National Register of Historic Places in 1998.

References

Historic districts on the National Register of Historic Places in Missouri
Farms on the National Register of Historic Places in Missouri
Houses completed in 1870
Buildings and structures in Warren County, Missouri
National Register of Historic Places in Warren County, Missouri